Kid Is Gone is a compilation of early recordings by the band Unwound. It documents demos, singles, live recordings, and the material that made up their 1995 album Unwound. It was released September 17, 2013 by The Numero Group as part 1 of a 4-part reissue series.

Track listing

	Bionic	 
   LD-50	                   
   Lying At Best	 
   Stumbling Block	 
 	Whilst You're Ahead	 
 	Rubber Band Heart	 
 	Crab Nebula	 
 	Caterpillar	 
 	Miserific Condition	 
 	Love And Fear
   You Speak Jealousy	 
 	Antifreeze	 
 	Rising Blood	 
 	Understand & Forget	 
 	Fingertips	 
 	You Bite My Tongue	 
 	Stuck In The Middle Of Nowhere Again	 
 	Warmth	 
   Prospect
 	Kid Is Gone (Chant Of Vengeance)	 
 	Kandy Korn Rituals	 
 	Against	 
 	I'd Die To Know You	
   Sugarfit	 
 	Understand & Forget (KAOS Session)	 
 	Miserific Condition (KAOS Session)	 
 	Against (KAOS Session)	 
   Ape Skins (KAOS Session)	 
 	Awkward (KAOS Session)	 
   Antifreeze (Live)	 
 	Rising Blood (Live)	 
 	Prospect (Live)	 
 	Stuck In The Middle Of Nowhere Again (Live)	 
   Hating In D (Live)

References

2013 albums
Unwound albums